South African Airways Flight 295 (SA295/SAA295) was a scheduled international passenger flight from Chiang Kai-shek International Airport, Taipei, Taiwan, to Jan Smuts International Airport, Johannesburg, South Africa, with a stopover in Plaisance Airport, Plaine Magnien, Mauritius. On 28 November 1987, the aircraft serving the flight, a Boeing 747-200 Combi named Helderberg, experienced a catastrophic in-flight fire in the cargo area, broke up in mid-air, and crashed into the Indian Ocean east of Mauritius, killing all 159 people on board.

The official inquiry, headed by Judge Cecil Margo, was unable to determine the cause of the fire. This lack of a conclusion led to conspiracy theories, debates and speculation about the nature of Flight 295's cargo being advanced, as well as a subsequent post-apartheid investigation and calls from relatives of those on the flight to re-open the investigation in the years following the accident.

Aircraft and crew
The aircraft involved, a Boeing 747-244BM Combi registered ZS-SAS and named Helderberg. This was the 488th built 747, made its first flight on 12 November 1980 and was delivered to South African Airways (SAA) on 24 November 1980.

The Boeing 747-200B Combi model permits the mixing of passengers and cargo on the main deck according to load factors on any given route and Class B cargo compartment regulations. Flight 295 had 140 passengers and six pallets of cargo on the main deck. The master waybills stated that  of baggage and cargo were loaded on the aircraft. A Taiwanese customs official performed a surprise inspection of some of the cargo; he did not find anything that could be characterised as suspicious. According to Tinus Jacobs who was SAA's manager in Taiwan at the time of Flight 295, the flight crew appeared relaxed and "happy to fly" before takeoff and did not display any concerns about the cargo.

The captain of Flight 295 was 49-year-old Dawie Jacobus Uys, a former air force pilot with 13,843 hours' experience of which  3,884 hours was on the Boeing 747 series airplanes. Uys was described by colleagues as professional and skilled and at the time of the accident was considering retiring to take up a role with the South African Pilots' Association. The flight crew also consisted of 36-year-old first officer David Attwell and 37-year-old relief first officer Geoffrey Birchall, with 7,362 and 8,749 hours' experience respectively; and 45-year-old flight engineer, Giuseppe "Joe" Bellagarda and 34-year-old relief flight engineer, Alan Daniel, with 7,804 hours and 1,595 hours of experience respectively.

Accident
Flight 295 took off at 14:23 UTC (22:23 local time) on 27 November 1987 from Taipei Chiang Kai Shek International Airport, on a flight to Johannesburg via Mauritius. 

Thirty-four minutes after departure, the crew contacted Hong Kong air traffic control to obtain clearance from waypoint ELATO to ISBAN. A position report was made over ELATO at 15:03:25, followed by waypoints SUNEK at 15:53:52, ADMARK at 16:09:54 and SUKAR at 16:34:47. The aircraft made a routine report to the SAA base at Johannesburg at 15:55:18.

At some point during the flight, believed to be during the beginning of its landing approach to Mauritius, a fire developed in the cargo section on the main deck which was probably not extinguished before impact. The 'smoke evacuation' checklist calls for the aircraft to be depressurised, and for two of the cabin doors to be opened. No evidence exists that the checklist was followed or that the doors were opened. A crew member might have gone into the cargo hold to try to fight the fire. A charred fire extinguisher was later recovered from the wreckage on which investigators found molten metal.

The following communication was recorded with Mauritius air traffic control, located at Plaisance Airport near Port Louis:

The fire began to destroy the aircraft's important electrical systems, resulting in loss of communication and control of the aircraft. Other theories given for the ultimate demise of the aircraft were that the flight crew eventually became incapacitated by the smoke and fire or extensive damage to the 747's control systems rendered the plane uncontrollable before it hit the ocean.

After communication with Flight 295 was lost for thirty-six minutes, at 00:44 (04:44 local time), air traffic control at Plaisance Airport formally declared an emergency.

Search and salvage

When Flight 295 last informed Plaisance air traffic control of its position, its report was incorrectly understood to be relative to the airport rather than its next waypoint, which caused the subsequent search to be concentrated too close to Mauritius. The United States Navy sent aircraft from Diego Garcia, which were used to conduct immediate search and rescue operations in conjunction with the French Navy. By the time the first surface debris was located twelve hours after impact, it had drifted considerably from the impact location. Oil slicks and eight bodies showing signs of extreme trauma appeared in the water. There were no survivors.

Investigation
Rennie Van Zyl, South Africa's head crash investigator, examined three wristwatches from baggage recovered from the surface; two of the watches were still running according to Taiwan time. Van Zyl deduced the approximate time of impact at 00:07:00, around three minutes after the last communication with air traffic control.

Immediately after the crash, the press and public opinion suspected that terrorism brought down Flight 295. South Africa, then under the control of the apartheid government, was the target of terrorism both domestically and internationally, and offices for SAA, the country's flag carrier, had previously been attacked. Experts searched for indicators of an explosion on the initial pieces of wreckage discovered, such as surface pitting, impact cavities and spatter cavities caused by white-hot fragments from explosive devices that strike and melt metal alloys found in aircraft structures. Experts found none of this evidence. The investigators drew blood samples from two of the recovered bodies and found that the bodies had soot in their tracheae, indicating that at least two had died from smoke inhalation before the aircraft had crashed, and concluded that some of the passengers would have already lost their lives even if the pilots had successfully reached the airport.

South Africa mounted an underwater search, named 'Operation Resolve', to try to locate the wreckage. The underwater locator beacons (ULBs) attached to the flight recorders were not designed for deep ocean use; nevertheless, a two-month-long sonar search for them was carried out before the effort was abandoned on 8 January 1988 when the ULBs were known to have stopped transmitting (at the time a ULB had to generate sonic pulses for thirty days). Steadfast Oceaneering, a specialist deep-ocean recovery company in the US, was contracted at great expense to find the site and recover the flight recorders. The search area is described as being comparable in size to that of the wreck of the Titanic, with the water at  being considerably deeper than any previously successful salvage operation. The wreckage was found within two days of Steadfast Oceaneering commencing its search.

Van Zyl took the voice recorder to the US National Transportation Safety Board (NTSB) in Washington, DC, both to show his goodwill and to ensure neutral observers. Van Zyl believes that if he kept the CVR in South Africa he could have been accused of covering up the truth. At the NTSB, Van Zyl felt frustration that the degraded (but still functional) CVR, which had been in the deep ocean for fourteen months, did not initially yield any useful information. Around twenty-eight minutes into the recording the CVR indicated that the fire alarm sounded. Fourteen seconds after the fire alarm, the circuit breakers began to pop. Investigators believe that around eighty circuit breakers failed. The CVR cable failed eighty-one seconds after the alarm. The recording revealed the extent of the fire.

Van Zyl discovered that the front-right pallet located in the main deck's cargo hold was the seat of the fire. The flight manifest said that pallet mostly comprised computers in polystyrene packaging. The investigators said that the localised fire likely came in contact with the packaging and produced gases that accumulated near the ceiling. They also said that gases ignited into a flash fire that affected the entire cargo hold. The fire did not burn lower than one metre above the cargo floor. The walls and ceiling of the cargo hold received severe fire damage. Van Zyl ended his investigation without discovering why the fire started.

The official report noted the presence of the computer equipment, and suggested that a possible cause could have been the lithium batteries contained in the computers exploding or spontaneously combusting, although this was not given as a conclusive cause of the fire.

Margo commission
An official commission of inquiry was chaired by South African Judge Cecil Margo, with co-operation from the NTSB and the aircraft's manufacturer, Boeing. The board of the "Margo Commission" consisted of Judge Cecil S. Margo, Judge Hurrylall Goburdhun (Mauritius), George N. Tompkins Jr (USA), G.C. Wilkinson (UK), Dr Y. Funatsu (Japan), J.J.S. Germisuys (South Africa), Dr J. Gilliland (South Africa) and Colonel Liang Lung (Taiwan).

The official report determined that while Flight 295 was over the Indian Ocean, a fire had occurred in the cargo hold of the main deck, originating in the front right-hand cargo pallet. The fire also damaged and destroyed the aircraft's electrical systems resulting in the loss of many of the instruments on the flight deck and rendering the crew unable to determine their position. The reason for the aircraft's loss was not identified beyond doubt, but there were two possibilities detailed in the official report: firstly, that the crew became incapacitated due to smoke penetrating into the cockpit; and secondly, that the fire weakened the structure so that the tail separated, leading to impact with the ocean. The commission concluded that it was not possible to apportion blame to any one individual for the fire, removing any terrorism concerns. Boeing is quoted in the report as having "contested" any scenario that involved a break-up of the aircraft, hence the commission went no further than simply mentioning the two possible scenarios in its final report, as incidental to the primary cause of the accident.

The commission determined that inadequate fire detection and suppression facilities in the class B cargo bays (the type used aboard the 747-200 Combi) were the primary cause of the aircraft's loss. The accident alerted aviation authorities worldwide that the regulations regarding class B cargo bays had lagged far behind the growth in their capacity. The exact source of ignition was never determined, but the report concluded that there was sufficient evidence to confirm that the fire had burned for some considerable time and that it might have caused structural damage.

Combi design
The crash was the first fire incident on the 747 Combi and one of few fires on widebody aircraft. Fred Bereswill, the investigator from Boeing, characterised the Flight 295 fire as significant for this reason. Barry Strauch of the NTSB visited Boeing's headquarters to inquire about the Combi's design. Boeing's fire test in the Combi models did not accurately match the conditions of Flight 295's cargo hold; in accordance with federal US rules, the Boeing test involved setting a bale of tobacco leaves ablaze. The fire stayed within the cargo hold. The air in the passenger cabin was designed to have a marginally higher pressure than cargo area hold, so if a crew member opened the door to the cargo hold, the air from the passenger cabin would flow into the cargo hold, stopping any smoke or gases from exiting through the door.

Investigators devised a new test involving a cargo hold with conditions similar to the conditions of Flight 295; the plastic covers and extra pallets provided fuel for the fire, which would spread quickly before generating enough smoke to activate smoke alarms. The hotter flame achieved in the new test heated the air in the cargo hold. This heated air had a higher pressure than normal, and overcame the pressure differential between the cargo hold and the passenger cabin. When the door between the passenger and cargo holds was open, smoke and gases therefore flowed into the passenger cabin.

The test, as well as evidence from the accident site, proved to the investigators that the 747 Combi's use of a class B cargo hold did not provide enough fire protection to the passengers. The US Federal Aviation Administration (FAA) confirmed this finding in 1993 with its own series of tests.

After the accident, SAA discontinued use of the Combi and the FAA introduced new regulations in 1993 specifying that manual firefighting must not be the primary means of fire suppression in the cargo compartment of the main deck. Complying with these new standards required weight increases, which made the 747 Combi no longer viable. Nevertheless, the Combi remained in the 747 product line up until 2002, when the last 747-400 Combi was delivered to KLM.

Conspiracy theories regarding the cause of the fire
In January 1992, the journal of the Royal Aeronautical Society (RAeS) reported that the inquiry into the in-flight fire that destroyed Flight 295 might be reopened because SAA had allegedly confirmed that its passenger jets had carried cargo for Armscor, a South African arms agency. The RAeS journal, Aerospace, asserted: "It is known that the crew and passengers were overcome by a main deck cargo fire, and the ignition of missile rocket fuel is one cause now under suspicion." A complaint against the newspaper that first published the allegations, Weekend Star, was lodged by Armscor.

The inquiry was not reopened, which likely led to the proliferation of a number of conspiracy theories concerning the nature of the cargo that caused the fire, which subsequently increased public doubts about the outcome of the initial inquiry. Examples of such theories include:
 The South African Defence Force was smuggling the hoax substance red mercury on Flight 295 for its atomic bomb project.
 Reports from the Project Coast investigation suggested there was a waybill showing that 300 grams of activated carbon had been placed on board Flight 295, leading to speculation that this substance had caused the fire.

The South African television program Carte Blanche dedicated an investigation to a number of these allegations.

A South African government chemist examined a microscopic particle on the nylon netting next to the front-right pallet on Flight 295. The chemist found that the airflow patterns on the iron suggested that it travelled at a high velocity while in a molten state; therefore the fire on Flight 295 may have not been a flash fire triggered by packaging. Fred Bereswill, the investigator from Boeing, said that this would suggest that the source of the fire would have had properties like a sparkler, with the source including its own oxidising agent. A British fire and explosion analyst examined the exterior skin of the aircraft which had been located above the pallet; the analyst found that the skin became as hot as 300 degrees Celsius. Bereswill said that it would be difficult for a fire to burn through the skin of an aircraft in-flight because of the cool airflow outside the aircraft.

David Klatzow's theory
Dr David Klatzow was one of the forensic scientists who, by his own admission, was retained to work on the case by Boeing's counsel around the time of the official enquiry. He subsequently criticised the Margo commission for spending an inordinate amount of time looking into "relatively irrelevant issues" and that the commission ignored the most important question: what was the source of the fire and who had been responsible for loading it onto the aircraft? Klatzow believes that there are certain irregularities in parts of the commission transcript that indicate that something on the CVR transcript had to be concealed.

Klatzow put forward a theory that the fire likely involved substances that would not normally be carried on a passenger aircraft and that the fire was not likely a wood, cardboard, or plastic fire. South Africa was under an arms embargo at the time; the South African government therefore had to buy arms clandestinely. Klatzow's theory postulates that the government placed a rocket system in the cargo hold, and that vibration caused the ignition of unstable ammonium perchlorate, which is a chemical compound used as a missile propellant.

Klatzow contends that conversation of the crew suggests that the fire started above the South China Sea, shortly after takeoff; he believes that this indicates that the voice recorder was not working for a long period of the flight or that the crew turned it off (CVRs in aircraft at that time only recorded thirty minutes). If this is the case, he says it is then likely that an unknown number of the passengers would have already died from smoke inhalation from the first fire. Klatzow believes that theory is consistent with reports that found most of the passengers were in the first class area at the front of the aircraft as smoke from the rear cabin forced them to move forward. The captain did not land the aircraft directly after the fire, Klatzow argues, because if he had he would have been arrested for endangering the lives of his passengers and it would have caused a major problem for South Africa, costing the country and SAA R400 million (approx. $200 million in 1987). Klatzow argues that the captain, who was also a reservist in the South African Air Force, would therefore have been ordered to carry on to South Africa in hopes of making it there before the aircraft's structural integrity gave in. These points have been refuted by others.

On 20 July 2011, retired SAA captain Clair Fichardt announced that he had made a statement in connection with the missing Johannesburg air traffic control tapes, after he was persuaded to do so by Klatzow. Fichardt claimed that Captain James Deale admitted to handing the tapes to Captain Mickey Mitchell, who was chief pilot at the Johannesburg control centre on the night of the crash. Deale would further have stated that Gert van der Veer, head of SAA, and lawyer Ardie Malherbe were present during the transfer of the tapes. Earlier, during the Truth and Reconciliation Commission (TRC) hearings, Klatzow had cross-examined Van der Veer, Mitchell, and Vernon Nadel, the operations officer who was on duty.

Post-apartheid investigation
In 1996, the TRC, established by the post-apartheid South African government, investigated apartheid-era atrocities. In particular, Flight 295 was investigated to determine if there was any truth behind conspiracy theories that asserted that the Margo Commission had covered up or missed any evidence that might implicate the previous government. Klatzow was invited by the TRC to explain his theories and cross-examine witnesses. Unlike most other hearings of the TRC, the hearing into Flight 295 was conducted in camera, and without any representation from the South African Civil Aviation Authority (CAA); Klatzow considered the CAA untrustworthy because it had participated in the official enquiry, which he considered flawed. A number of key aspects of Klatzow's theory hinged on his criticism of the actions of Judge Margo during the official enquiry, yet Judge Margo was not summoned to answer any of the allegations made against him.

The TRC concluded that nothing listed in the flight manifest could have caused the fire, a conclusion that was met with controversy within the public. Following public pressure, the TRC records were released into the public domain in May 2000. Upon receiving the documents, Transport Minister Dullah Omar stated that the inquiry would be reopened if any fresh evidence was discovered. The South African Police Service were tasked to investigate whether there was any new evidence, and to make a recommendation to the minister. In October 2002, the minister announced that no new evidence had been found to justify re-opening the enquiry.

On the 25th anniversary of the crash, Peter Otzen Jnr, the son of one of the victims, announced that he was approaching the Constitutional Court of South Africa in an attempt to have the commission of inquiry into the disaster reopened. In pursuit of this, he had obtained affidavits from former SAA employees who had never given any evidence before. An Australian national named Allan Dexter who had worked in public relations for SAA gave a sworn statement to Mr. Otzen claiming that he had been informed by the SAA manager at Taipei airport that Flight 295 was carrying rocket fuel which caused it to crash, and that the Captain had expressed concerns about the safety of the cargo but had been ordered from Johannesburg to fly the plane. In a 2014 interview, some of the accusations were disputed by Tinus Jacobs, SAA's manager in Taiwan who saw Flight 295 off. Jacobs claimed that due to Taiwan's status under martial law at the time, only one telephone at the airport (located in the office of China Airlines) could be used to make international calls and that none of Flight 295's crew had access to it. Jacobs furthermore claimed that Captain Uys and the other crew members appeared relaxed and routine both the previous day and on the evening of the flight's departure.

Newer theories
In 2014, South African investigative journalist Mark D. Young presented a theory that a short circuit in the onboard electronics may have started the fire. The so-called wet arc tracking arises from the action of moisture when the insulation of live wires is damaged. A leakage current to another damaged wire with the respective potential difference may form. This temperature is sufficient to ignite the thermal-acoustic insulation blankets that were in use at the time until the late 1990s. Such a short circuit may have caused the fire on board Swissair Flight 111, resulting in the crash of the aircraft in 1998.

Passengers and crew
Passengers and crew nationalities on board SAA Flight 295:

Taiwanese authorities stated that 58 passengers began flying in Taipei, including 30 Taiwanese citizens, 19 South Africans, 3 Japanese, two Mauritians, one Dane, one Dutch, one Briton, and one West German. The other passengers transferred from other flights arriving in Taipei, and as such their nationalities were not known to Taiwanese authorities.

At least two passengers died of smoke inhalation. The rest died from the extreme trauma sustained in the crash.

Among the passengers was Kazuharu Sonoda, a Japanese professional wrestler also known as Haru Sonoda and Magic Dragon, and his wife, who were travelling as part of their honeymoon. They were offered and sent on the flight by All Japan Pro-Wrestling president Giant Baba to appear on a wrestling show in South Africa, promoted by fellow wrestler Tiger Jeet Singh.

Dramatisation
The crash was featured in Season 5 of the Canadian-made, internationally distributed documentary series Mayday, in the episode "Fanning the Flames."

See also

References
Notes

Bibliography

Further reading
 .

External links

 Abridged ATC Recording An MP3 format of part of the actual ATC recording. The real recording starts at 21 minutes. It is slightly abridged, with some empty sound cut short.
 
 Vol South African Airways 295 : Maldonne à Pretoria (French)
 "We have a smoke problem in the aeroplane!" Die "Helderberg"-Tragödie (German)
 "SAA 747 Wreckage Examined in Detail" a 1989 Flight article

1987 disasters in Africa
1987 fires in Africa
1987 in Mauritius
1987 in South Africa
1996 in South Africa
Accidents and incidents involving the Boeing 747
Airliner accidents and incidents caused by in-flight fires
Airliner accidents and incidents caused by in-flight structural failure
Aviation accidents and incidents in 1987
Aviation accidents and incidents in the Indian Ocean
Conspiracy theories involving aviation incidents
Marine salvage operations
November 1987 events in Africa
November 1987 events in Asia
South Africa–Taiwan relations
South African Airways accidents and incidents